Serafym (secular name Serhiy Dmytrovych Verzun, ; October 8, 1949 - April 7, 2012) was the Ukrainian Orthodox archbishop of the Ukrainian Orthodox Church of the Kyivan Patriarchate.

He was born in 1949, studied at the Odessa Theological Seminary of the Russian Orthodox Church.

June 25, 1992 he joined to the Kyiv Patriarchate.

He was consecrated as Bishop of Vyshhorod, auxiliary of the Eparchy of Kyiv, by Filaret (Denysenko), Antoniy (Masendych), Andriy (Horak), Volodymyr (Romaniuk).

Notes

External links
Profile at Official UOC KP site 

1949 births
2012 deaths
20th-century Eastern Orthodox bishops
21st-century Eastern Orthodox bishops
Soviet people
Ukrainian Orthodox bishops